First unveiled in the Russian Army Expo 2017 alongside the AMB-17, the AM-17 (awaiting GRAU designation), is an assault rifle that uses standard intermediate cartridge 5.45×39mm 7N10 cartridge. It was developed and manufactured by in the late 2010s by Kalashnikov Concern based on the Yevgeny Dragunov MA Compact Rifle. The weapon is intended for use as a close quarters weapon, primarily for military and law enforcement units of the Russian Interior Ministry, Russian National Guard, and Russian Army to replace the AKS-74U.

Design details

Operating mechanism
The AM-17 unlike previous firearms in current use by the Russian military differentiates itself by employing two receivers that connect on a hinge instead of a single stamped receiver with a lid. To do this the upper receiver itself is made from polymer and steel reinforcements, while the lower receiver along with its magazine housing is made entirely from polymer and connected to the upper receiver by two captive take down cross-pins reducing the weight of the firearm significantly and allowing for easier access into the internal operation. The gas operated action within is a short stroke gas piston and rotary bolt which locks with three radial lugs on the bolt head similar to historic 9x39mm carbines such as the VSK-94. The bolt carrier within the upper receiver is almost streamline by design raising it towards the bolt group reducing both bolt friction and felt user recoil.

Features
The weapon has an integrated upper full-length MIL-STD/1913 Picatinny railing, polymer side-folding and adjustable (telescoping) shoulder stock, and longitudinal slots in the walls of the upper receiver allowing for ambidextrous controls in both the fire selector and charging handle.

Users and service history
 : The AM-17 is in limited use with FSB, FSO, Russian National Guard, and VVS specifically for firearms testing and has yet to complete acceptance trials.

See also
AK-9
AMB-17
List of Russian weaponry
List of equipment of the Russian Ground Forces

References

External links
 Larry Vickers shooting AM-17 assault rifle

5.45×39mm assault rifles
Assault rifles of Russia
Carbines
Personal defense weapons
Kalashnikov Concern products